Elisabeth Klara Viktoria Kalko (10 April 1962 – 26 September 2011) was a German tropical scientist and ecologist working at the Smithsonian Institution and the University of Ulm.

Life
Elisabeth Kalko was an ecologist with a first degree in biology from the University of Tübingen in Germany, which was followed by a doctorate in 1991. The topic of her thesis was The ecolocation and hunting behaviour of three European dwarf bat species Pipistrellus pipistrellus (Schreber, 1774), Pipistrellus nathuslii (Keyserling et Blasius, 1839) and Pipistrellus kuhli (Kuhl, 1819), in the wild. Her doctoral studies were conducted as fellow of the National Merit Foundation ('Studienstiftung', 1984–1987, 1988–1990). From 1991 to 1993, Kalko held a NATO post-doctoral fellowship for research at the National Museum of Natural History, Smithsonian Institution, Washington, D. C. (USA) and at the Smithsonian Tropical Research Institute, Panama. From 1993 to 1997, she worked on the DFG programs 'Mechanism maintaining tropical diversity' (research group) and 'Diversity, structure and dynamics of neotropical bats' and held a DFG Heisenberg fellowship from 1997 to 1999. The fellowship was completed in 1999 in Tübingen.

In 1999, Kalko was appointed staff scientist at the Smithsonian Tropical Research Institute in Panama. She spent considerable time on expeditions and at scientific institutions in the US, including National Museum of Natural History in Washington, D.C., in the Congo and many other countries. Beginning in 2000, Kalko held a joint appointment not only at STRI but also as director and full professor at the Institute of Experimental Ecology at the University of Ulm in Germany. Her scientific team included a leading German entomologist, Heiko Bellmann. She also maintained relations with the American Museum of Natural History (AMNH) as a Research Associate.

Kalko was a member of the German National Committee on Global Change Research (2002–2011), and was elected for life to the Heidelberg Academy of Sciences (2006). From 2005 to 2011, she was vice-president of the Society of Tropical Ecology (GTOE), and from 2008 on she was a member of the Senate Commission on Biodiversity of the German Research Foundation (DFG). The same year, Kalko became Head Elect of DIVERSITAS Germany. As editor-in-chief of the international tropical ecology journal Ecotropica, she strengthened the journal's profile considerably. During the early 2000s, she was a prominent expert in the areas of bat community ecology, echolocation and bat behaviour.

Kalko died during a visit in Tanzania on 26 September 2011.

Research

Kalko's research highlighted the importance of bats for maintenance of tropical forests and revealed that ecolocation signal intensity has been a largely underestimated aspect in echolocation research (links below). Kalko initiated and led a series of German Research Foundation (DFG) projects into tropical bat ecology, biodiversity and zoonoses on all continents, and spearheaded EU-funded research in bioacoustics.

References

External links
 Elisabeth Kalko STRI publication list
 SWR TV: The bat researcher Elisabeth Kalko (in German)
 ZDF Knowledge – The bat island of Elisabeth Kalko in Panama (in German)
 Planet Knowledge, Portrait of Elisabeth Kalko (in German)
 3Sat Nano, 'The bat researcher' (in German)
 German National Committee on Global Change Research
 Ecotropica, an international journal of tropical ecology
 University of Ulm, Elisabeth Kalko homepage
 Bats cry out loud to detect their prey (PLoS One, 30 April 2008)
 Bats limit arthropods and herbivory in a tropical forest (Science, 4 April 2008)

1962 births
2011 deaths
German ecologists
German naturalists
Scientists from Berlin
University of Tübingen alumni
Academic staff of the University of Ulm
German women academics
Women ecologists
Women naturalists
20th-century German scientists
20th-century German women scientists
21st-century German scientists
21st-century German women scientists
Smithsonian Institution people